The Latest from Paris is a 1928 American silent romantic drama film directed by Sam Wood and written by Joseph Farnham and A. P. Younger. The film stars Norma Shearer, George Sidney, Ralph Forbes, Tenen Holtz, and William Bakewell. The film was released on February 4, 1928, by Metro-Goldwyn-Mayer.

Cast 
Norma Shearer as Ann Dolan
George Sidney as Sol Blogg
Ralph Forbes as Joe Adams
Tenen Holtz as Abe Littauer
William Bakewell as Bud Dolan
Margaret Landis as Louise Martin
Bert Roach as Bert Blevins
Ethel M. Jackson
Della Peterson

Preservation status
The film survives, preserved by MGM, with only reel 4 missing.

References

External links 

Stills at silentfilmstillarchive.com

1928 films
American romantic drama films
Metro-Goldwyn-Mayer films
Films directed by Sam Wood
American black-and-white films
American silent feature films
1928 romantic drama films
1920s English-language films
1920s American films
Silent romantic drama films
Silent American drama films